Lies We Tell is a 2017 British crime thriller film directed by Mitu Misra and starring Gabriel Byrne, Sibylla Deen and Harvey Keitel.  It is Misra's directorial debut.

Plot
A trusted driver must deal with his dead boss' Muslim mistress, her dark past pulling him into a life-and-death showdown with her notorious gangster cousin/ex-husband.

Cast
 Gabriel Byrne as Donald
 Harvey Keitel as Demi
 Mark Addy as Billy
 Sibylla Deen as Amber
 Jan Uddin as K.D.
 Reece Ritchie as Nathan
 Emily Atack as Tracey
 Danica Johnson as Miriam
 Gina McKee as Heather

Reception
, Lies We Tell holds a 0% approval rating on Rotten Tomatoes, based on 16 reviews with an average rating of 3.75/10.  Glenn Kenny of RogerEbert.com awarded the film two stars.  Nick De Semlyen of Empire awarded the film two stars out of five.

References

External links
 
 

British crime thriller films
2017 directorial debut films
2010s English-language films
2010s British films